Amga or AMGA may refer to:
Amga (rural locality), a rural locality (a selo) in the Amginsky District of the Sakha Republic, Russia
Amga (river), a river in the Sakha Republic, Russia
American Medical Group Association (AMGA)
American Mountain Guides Association (AMGA)
GLite-AMGA, a general purpose metadata catalogue
 Armenian Media Group of America, also known as “AMGA” or “amga”, Armenian-American TV channel organization, founded in 1999

See also
Verkhnyaya Amga, a rural locality (a selo) in the Aldansky District of the Sakha Republic, Russia
Amginsky District, a district of the Sakha Republic, Russia